Barbus carottae is a species of ray-finned fish in the genus Barbus from Lake Yliki in Greece.

References

 

C
Fish described in 1998